The XXIV Army Corps was a corps of the Royal Italian Army between 1916-1917, and in 1943.

History 
There was a XXIV Corps in World War I, formed on 23 May 1916 and dissolved on 22 November 1917.

On 1 March 1943, a new XXIV Corps was created in Udine from the remnants of the Italian Alpine Army Corps returning from Russia. 
From 1 June it was operational around Udine in intense anti-guerrilla activities  against Italian and Yugoslav partisans. 
The XXIV Corps was disarmed by the Germans and dissolved on 11 September 1943, as a result of the Armistice of Cassibile.

Composition (1943) 
3rd Alpine Division "Julia"
52nd Infantry Division "Torino"
 Alpine Marching Brigade
 troops of the 11th Border Guard Sector

Commanders
 Enrico Caviglia (1917-1917)
 Licurgo Zannini (1943.05.01 – 1943.09.11)

References 
 

Army corps of Italy in World War II